Ivan Horvat may refer to:
 Ivan Horvat (nobleman) (d. 1394), Croatian name for John Horvat, Croatian nobleman
 Ivan Horvat (footballer) (1926–2012), known as Ivica Horvat, Croatian footballer
 Ivan Horvat (pole vaulter) (born 1993), Croatian pole vaulter
 Ivan Horvat (handballer) (born 1993), player for SG Flensburg-Handewitt

See also
 Jovan Horvat (1713–1780), known as Ivan Khorvat, Russian general